Church of the Blessed Sacrament or Corpus Christi Church ( or ) is a Roman Catholic church in the Old Town of Kaunas, Lithuania. The church was damaged by the Napoleonic Army in 1812 and together with the Dominican Monastery was closed in 1845 by the order of Russian tsar Nicholas I of Russia, in 1865 it was converted into an Orthodox church.

Gallery

References

17th-century Roman Catholic church buildings in Lithuania
Roman Catholic churches in Kaunas
Baroque architecture in Lithuania